Major-General Roderic Loraine Petre  (28 November 188721 July 1971) was a senior British Army officer.

Military career
Born the son of Francis Loraine Petre and Maud Ellen Rawlinson, Petre attended Downside School near Midsomer Norton and Stratton-on-the-Fosse, where he sang treble in the boys choir. After graduating from the Royal Military College at Sandhurst, he was  commissioned into the South Wales Borderers of the British Army in February 1908.

He served with his regiment, initially in China, and later in the Gallipoli campaign of the First World War, and was awarded the Military Cross in 1916. He was also appointed a companion of the Distinguished Service Order in 1917 for his service in Mesopotamia. He was also mentioned in dispatches seven times throughout the war.

He served in Afghanistan in 1919 and, after marrying in 1922, he returned to England where he attended the Staff College at Camberley from 1923 to 1924. This was followed by three years at the War Office in London as a staff officer. Upon transferring to the Dorset Regiment in 1929 and became commanding officer (CO) of the regiment's 2nd Battalion in 1932. After commanding the battalion until 1935, he served as a staff officer with the Sudan Defence Force until 1938.

He went on to be Commandant of the Senior Officers' School, Sheerness in May 1938 and then General Officer Commanding (GOC) 12th (Eastern) Infantry Division in France in October 1939 at the beginning of the Second World War. In April 1940 the division landed in France and in May 1940 he took command of 'Petreforce', a grouping of the 12th (Eastern) Infantry Division, the 23rd (Northumbrian) Division, and other nearby units formed to defend allied positions near Arras. In the fighting the "12th and 23rd Divisions ... had practically ceased to exist" as a result of the fighting that saw the "whole tract of country between the Scarpe and the Somme" fall into German hands.

After being evacuated through Dunkirk, Petre then became GOC of the 48th (South Midland) Division in June 1940 and initiated training to repel Operation Sea Lion, the German invasion of England, which proved abortive, remaining in that role until October 1941. He served briefly as GOC of IX Corps before being made commander of South Midland District before his retirement from the army im 1944.

References

Bibliography

External links
Generals of World War II

|-

|-

1887 births
1971 deaths
Graduates of the Royal Military College, Sandhurst
Dorset Regiment officers
Companions of the Distinguished Service Order
Recipients of the Military Cross
People educated at Downside School
British Army generals of World War II
Roderic
People from Indore
Graduates of the Staff College, Camberley
South Wales Borderers officers
British Army major generals
Military personnel of British India
British Army personnel of World War I
Commandants of the Senior Officers' School, Sheerness
British people in colonial India